The 2005 Atlantic hurricane season was an event in the annual tropical cyclone season in the north Atlantic Ocean. It was the second most active Atlantic hurricane season in recorded history, and the most extreme (i.e. produced the highest accumulated cyclone energy (ACE)) in the satellite era. Officially, the season began on June 1, 2005 and ended on November 30, 2005. These dates, adopted by convention, historically delimit the period in each year when most tropical systems form. The season's first storm, Tropical Storm Arlene, developed on June 8. The final storm, Tropical Storm Zeta, formed in late December and persisted until January 6, 2006. Zeta is only the second December Atlantic storm in recorded history to survive into January, joining Hurricane Alice in 1955.

The season's impact was widespread and catastrophic. Its storms touched virtually every part of the Atlantic basin. Altogether, there were 28 named tropical storms during the season, exhausting the annual pre-designated list and resulting in the usage of six Greek letter names. A record 15 tropical storms attained hurricane strength, of which a record seven intensified into major hurricanes. Six hurricanes made landfall or near-landfall on the U.S. during the season: Cindy, Dennis, Katrina, Ophelia, Rita and Wilma. Record-breaking 2005 hurricanes included:
 Emily, the strongest hurricane ever on record to form in the month of July, with peak winds of 160 mph (260 km/h), later weakening and striking Mexico twice;
 Katrina, which became the costliest tropical cyclone on record, causing over 1,200 deaths and $125 billion in damage, particularly in the city of New Orleans and the surrounding areas;
 Wilma, which became the most intense Atlantic hurricane on record, recording a barometric pressure of 882 mbar (hPa; 26.05 inHg).
Following the 2005 season, the names Dennis, Katrina, Rita, Stan and Wilma were retired from reuse in the North Atlantic by the World Meteorological Organization.

This timeline documents tropical cyclone formations, strengthening, weakening, landfalls, extratropical transitions, and dissipations during the season. It includes information that was not released throughout the season, meaning that data from post-storm reviews by the National Hurricane Center, such as a storm that was not initially warned upon, has been included. The graphical bar below gives a brief overview of storm activity during the season. Each storm's maximum intensity is represented by the color of its bar.

By convention, meteorologists use one time zone when issuing forecasts and making observations: Coordinated Universal Time (UTC), and also use the 24-hour clock (where 00:00 = midnight UTC). In this time line, all information is listed by UTC first with the respective local time included in parentheses.

Timeline

June

June 1
 The 2005 Atlantic hurricane season officially begins.

June 8
 18:00 UTC (2:00 p.m. EDT)Tropical Depression One forms just north of the northeastern coast of Honduras.

June 9
 06:00 UTC (2:00 a.m.

June 10
 08:00 UTC (4:00 a.m. EDT)Tropical Storm Arlene makes landfall near Cabo Corrientes, Cuba with sustained winds of 50 mph (80 km/h) winds.

June 11
 01:00 UTC (8:00 p.m.
 19:00 UTC (2:00 p.m. CDT)Tropical Storm Arlene makes landfall west of Pensacola, Florida with  winds.

June 12
 00:00 UTC (7:00 p.m. CDT, June 11)Tropical Storm Arlene weakens into a tropical depression inland near Barlow Bend, Alabama.

June 13
 18:00 UTC (2:00 p.m. EDT)Tropical Depression Arlene becomes extratropical just northeast of Flint, Michigan and is later absorbed by a front.

June 28
 18:00 UTC (1:00 p.m.

June 29
 00:00 UTC (7:00 p.m.
 12:00 UTC (7:00 a.m. CDT)Tropical Storm Bret makes landfall near Tuxpan, Veracruz with  winds.
 18:00 UTC (1:00 p.m. CDT)Tropical Storm Bret weakens into a tropical depression southwest of Tampico, Tamaulipas.

June 30
 03:00 UTC (10:00 p.m.

July

July 3
 18:00 UTC (1:00 p.m.

July 4
 03:30 UTC (10:30 p.m.
 18:00 UTC (2:00 p.m. EDT)Tropical Depression Four forms over the southern Windward Islands.
 21:00 UTC (5:00 p.m.

July 5
 06:00 UTC (1:00 a.m. CDT)Tropical Depression Three strengthens into Tropical Storm Cindy over the central Gulf of Mexico.
 12:00 UTC (8:00 a.m. EDT)Tropical Depression Four strengthens into Tropical Storm Dennis southeast of San Juan, Puerto Rico.

July 6
 00:00 UTC (7:00 p.m.
 03:00 UTC (10:00 p.m.
 06:00 UTC (1:00 a.m. CDT)Hurricane Cindy weakens into a tropical storm south-southeast of New Orleans, Louisiana along the Gulf coast.
 09:00 UTC (5:00 a.m.
 15:00 UTC (10:00 a.m.
 22:00 UTC (6:00 p.m.

July 7
 12:00 UTC (8:00 a.m. EDT (1500 UTC) – Tropical Depression Cindy becomes extratropical over northern Georgia, and subsequently dissipates over the Gulf of St. Lawrence.
 12:00 UTC (8:00 a.m.
 18:00 UTC (2:00 p.m.

July 8
 00:00 UTC (8:00 p.m.
 02:45 UTC (10:45 p.m. EDT, July 7)Hurricane Dennis makes landfall near Punta del Ingles (just east of Cabo Cruz) with  winds.
 03:00 UTC (11:00 p.m. EDT, July 7)Hurricane Dennis weakens to Category 3 while passing over land.
 12:00 UTC (8:00 a.m.
 18:45 UTC (2:45 p.m.

July 9
 09:00 UTC (5:00 a.m. EDT)Hurricane Dennis emerges into the Straits of Florida just east of Havana at Category 1 strength.
 11:00 UTC (7:00 a.m.
 23:00 UTC (7:00 p.m.

July 10
 05:00 UTC (1:00 a.m.
 12:00 UTC (7:00 a.m.
 19:00 UTC (2:00 p.m.
 19:30 UTC (2:30 p.m.

July 11
 00:00 UTC (8:00 p.m.
 01:00 UTC (8:00 p.m.
 06:00 UTC (1:00 a.m. CDT)Tropical Storm Dennis weakens into a tropical depression over central Alabama.

July 12
 00:00 UTC (8:00 p.m.

July 13
 15:00 UTC (10:00 a.m.

July 14
 00:00 UTC (8:00 p.m.
 07:00 UTC (3:00 a.m. AST)Hurricane Emily makes landfall on Grenada with  winds.
 12:00 UTC (8:00 a.m.
 18:00 UTC (2:00 p.m.

July 15
 06:00 UTC (2:00 a.m.

July 17
 00:00 UTC (8:00 p.m.

July 18
 06:30 UTC (2:30 a.m. EDT)Hurricane Emily makes landfall near Tulum, Quintana Roo with  winds.
 12:00 UTC (8:00 a.m. EDT)Hurricane Emily weakens over the Yucatán Peninsula, emerging into the Gulf of Mexico near Mérida, Yucatán at Category 1 strength.

July 19
 18:00 UTC (1:00 p.m. CDT)Hurricane Emily re-intensifies to Category 2 strength.

July 20
 00:00 UTC (7:00 p.m. CDT, July 19)Hurricane Emily re-intensifies to Category 3 strength.
 11:30 UTC (6:30 a.m. CDT)Hurricane Emily makes landfall near San Fernando, Tamaulipas with  winds.
 21:00 UTC (4:00 p.m.

July 21
 09:00 UTC (4:00 a.m.
 18:00 UTC (12:00 p.m. CDT)Tropical Depression Emily dissipates over the Sierra Madre Oriental.
 18:00 UTC (1:00 p.m.

July 22
 00:00 UTC (8:00 p.m.

July 23
 18:00 UTC (3:00 p.m.
 21:00 UTC (5:00 p.m.

July 24
 06:00 UTC (1:00 a.m.

July 25
 00:00 UTC (7:00 p.m.
 09:00 UTC (4:00 a.m.
 18:00 UTC (1:00 p.m. CDT)Tropical Depression Gert becomes a remnant low and dissipates over the mountains of central Mexico.

July 28
 00:00 UTC (8:00 p.m.

July 29
 21:00 UTC (5:00 p.m.

August

August 2
 18:00 UTC (2:00 p.m.

August 3
 06:00 UTC (2:00 a.m.

August 4
 18:00 UTC (2:00 p.m.

August 7
 15:00 UTC (11:00 a.m.

August 8
 12:00 UTC (8:00 a.m. AST)Tropical Storm Irene weakens into a tropical depression.

August 10
 00:00 UTC (8:00 p.m.

August 11
 00:00 UTC (8:00 p.m.

August 13
 12:00 UTC (8:00 a.m.

August 14
 15:00 UTC (11:00 a.m. AST)Tropical Depression Ten degenerates into a remnant low and subsequently dissipates.

August 15
 00:00 UTC (8:00 p.m. AST, August 14)Tropical Storm Irene intensifies to hurricane strength roughly midway between Bermuda and the Outer Banks of North Carolina.

August 16
 12:00 UTC (8:00 a.m. AST)Hurricane Irene reaches Category 2 intensity.
 18:00 UTC (2:00 p.m.

August 18
 18:00 UTC (2:00 p.m.

August 22
 12:00 UTC (8:00 a.m.
 18:00 UTC (2:00 p.m.

August 23
 03:30 UTC (10:30 p.m.
 12:00 UTC (7:00 a.m.
 18:00 UTC (2:00 p.m. EDT)Tropical Depression Twelve forms near Long Island, Bahamas.

August 24
 12:00 UTC (8:00 a.m.

August 25
 21:00 UTC (5:00 p.m.
 22:30 UTC (6:30 p.m. EDT)Hurricane Katrina makes its first landfall between Hallandale Beach and North Miami Beach, Florida, United States with  winds.

August 26
 05:00 UTC (1:00 a.m. EDT)Hurricane Katrina weakens over Monroe County, Florida and emerges into the gulf of Mexico as a tropical storm just north of Cape Sable.
 06:00 UTC (2:00 a.m. EDT)Tropical Storm Katrina re-intensifies to hurricane strength.
 18:00 UTC (2:00 p.m. EDT)Hurricane Katrina reaches Category 2 intensity.

August 27
 12:00 UTC (8:00 a.m.

August 28
 06:00 UTC (1:00 a.m. CDT)Hurricane Katrina reaches Category 4 intensity.
 12:00 UTC (7:00 a.m. CDT)Hurricane Katrina reaches Category 5 intensity.
 12:00 UTC (8:00 a.m.
 18:00 UTC (1:00 p.m.

August 29
 11:00 UTC (6:00 a.m.
 15:00 UTC (10:00 a.m. CDT)Hurricane Katrina makes its final landfall near the mouth of the Pearl River, just south of Pearlington, Mississippi, with sustained winds of   winds after crossing Breton Sound.
 15:00 UTC (11:00 a.m.

August 30
 00:00 UTC (7:00 p.m. CDT, August 29)Hurricane Katrina weakens into a tropical storm just northwest of Meridian, Mississippi.
 12:00 UTC (7:00 a.m. CDT)Tropical Storm Katrina weakens into a tropical depression over Middle Tennessee.

August 31
 00:00 UTC (8:00 p.m. EDT, August 30)Tropical Depression Katrina transitions into an extratropical low pressure system over the Ohio Valley and is later absorbed within a frontal zone over the eastern Great Lakes.
 06:00 UTC (2:00 a.m.
 12:00 UTC (8:00 a.m. AST)Tropical Depression Thirteen strengthens into Tropical Storm Lee in the central Atlantic between Bermuda and the Azores.

September

September 1
 00:00 UTC (8:00 p.m. AST, August 31)Tropical Storm Lee weakens to a tropical depression.
 12:00 UTC (8:00 a.m.

September 2
 06:00 UTC (2:00 a.m. AST)Tropical Depression Lee degenerates into a remnant low over the central Atlantic.
 12:00 UTC (8:00 a.m. AST)Tropical Depression Fourteen strengthens into Tropical Storm Maria.

September 4
 09:00 UTC (5:00 a.m.

September 5
 12:00 UTC (8:00 a.m. AST)Hurricane Maria reaches Category 2 intensity.
 18:00 UTC (2:00 p.m.

September 6
 00:00 UTC (8:00 p.m.
 00:00 UTC (8:00 p.m. EDT, September 5)Tropical Depression Fifteen strengthens into Tropical Storm Nate south-southwest of Bermuda.
 06:00 UTC (2:00 a.m. AST)Hurricane Maria weakens to Category 2 intensity.
 06:00 UTC (2:00 p.m. EDT)Tropical Depression Sixteen forms over the northern Bahamas.
 12:00 UTC (8:00 a.m. AST)Hurricane Maria weakens to Category 1 intensity.
 16:00 UTC (12:00 p.m. EDT)Tropical Depression Sixteen's broad circulation center crosses Grand Bahama Island with  winds.

September 7
 06:00 UTC (2:00 a.m.
 12:00 UTC (8:00 a.m.

September 8
 21:00 UTC (5:00 p.m.

September 9
 00:00 UTC (8:00 p.m.
 00:00 UTC (8:00 p.m.

September 10
 09:00 UTC (5:00 a.m.
 09:00 UTC (5:00 a.m. EDT)Hurricane Ophelia attains a minimum pressure of  about south-southeast of Charleston, South Carolina.
 18:00 UTC (2:00 p.m.

September 14
 12:00 UTC (8:00 a.m. EDT)Hurricane Ophelia attains its peak sustained wind speed of   about  miles south-southeast of Wilmington, North Carolina; its northern eyewall passed over the coast during this time.

September 15
 03:00 UTC (11:00 p.m.

September 16
 00:00 UTC (8:00 p.m. EDT, September 15)Hurricane Ophelia weakens into a tropical storm for the last time.

September 17
 12:00 UTC (8:00 a.m.
 18:00 UTC (2:00 p.m. EDT)Tropical Depression Seventeen strengthens into Tropical Storm Philippe east of Barbados.

September 18
 00:00 UTC (8:00 p.m.
 03:00 UTC (11:00 p.m.
 18:00 UTC (2:00 p.m.

September 19
 00:00 UTC (8:00 p.m.

September 20
 00:00 UTC (8:00 p.m.
 12:00 UTC (8:00 a.m. EDT)Hurricane Philippe weakens into a tropical storm east-northeast of the Leeward Islands.
 12:00 UTC (8:00 a.m.
 18:00 UTC (2:00 p.m.

September 21
 06:00 UTC (2:00 a.m.
 12:00 UTC (8:00 a.m.
 18:00 UTC (2:00 p.m. CDT)Hurricane Rita reaches Category 5 intensity.

September 22
 03:00 UTC (10:00 p.m.
 18:00 UTC (1:00 p.m.

September 23
 12:00 UTC (8:00 a.m. EDT)Tropical Storm Philippe weakens into a tropical depression.
 18:00 UTC (2:00 p.m. EDT)Tropical Depression Philippe degenerates to a remnant low south-southeast of Bermuda, and later becomes embedded within a broader non-tropical low.
 18:00 UTC (1:00 p.m.

September 24
 07:30 UTC (2:30 a.m. CDT) Hurricane Rita makes landfall between Sabine Pass and Johnson Bayou, Louisiana with  winds.
 12:00 UTC (7:00 a.m.

September 25
 03:00 UTC (10:00 p.m.

September 26
 06:00 UTC (1:00 a.m. CDT)Tropical Depression Rita degenerates to a remnant low over Southern Illinois and is later absorbed into a weather front.

September 30
 12:00 UTC (8:00 a.m.

October
October 1
 00:00 UTC (8:00 p.m.
 12:00 UTC (7:00 a.m.

October 2
 06:00 UTC (1:00 a.m. CDT)Tropical Depression Twenty strengthens into Tropical Storm Stan just off the eastern coast of the Yucatán Peninsula.
 10:00 UTC (5:00 a.m.
 15:00 UTC (11:00 a.m.

October 3
 00:00 UTC (7:00 p.m. CDT, October 2)Tropical Storm Stan weakens into a tropical depression over the Yucatán Peninsula.
 06:00 UTC (1:00 a.m. CDT)Tropical Depression Stan regains tropical storm strength after emerging off the northwestern coast of the Yucatán Peninsula.

October 4
 06:00 UTC (1:00 a.m.
 06:00 UTCA low pressure area in the eastern Atlantic gains some tropical characteristics and becomes a subtropical depression undetected.
 12:00 UTC (7:00 a.m.
 12:00 UTCThe undetected subtropical depression strengthens undetected into a tropical storm in the eastern Atlantic.
 18:00 UTC (1:00 p.m. CDT)Hurricane Stan weakens into a tropical storm south-southeast of Veracruz.

October 5
 00:00 UTC (7:00 p.m. CDT, October 4)Tropical Storm Stan weakens into a tropical depression and later dissipates over the Sierra Madre de Oaxaca.
 06:00 UTCThe undetected subtropical storm becomes extratropical over the northeastern Atlantic.
 06:00 UTC (2:00 a.m.
 18:00 UTC (2:00 p.m.
 23:00 UTC (7:00 p.m. EDT)Tropical Storm Tammy makes landfall near Atlantic Beach, Florida with  winds.

October 6
 12:00 UTC (8:00 a.m. EDT)Tropical Storm Tammy weakens into a tropical depression over southern Georgia.

October 7
 00:00 UTC (7:00 p.m. CDT, October 6)Tropical Depression Tammy degenerates into a remnant low pressure system over the Florida Panhandle and is later absorbed by a larger deep-layer extratropical low pressure system.

October 8
 06:00 UTC (2:00 a.m.
 06:00 UTC (7:00 a.m.

October 9
 12:00 UTC (1:00 p.m. WEST)Subtropical Storm Vince gains tropical characteristics and becomes Tropical Storm Vince.
 18:00 UTC (7:00 p.m.

October 10
 00:00 UTC (2:00 a.m. CEST)Hurricane Vince weakens to a tropical storm north-northwest of the Madeira Islands.
 06:00 UTC (2: a.m. EDT)Subtropical Depression Twenty-two degenerates into a remnant low and is late absorbed by a larger extratropical low.

October 11
 00:00 UTC (2:00 a.m.
 09:00 UTC (11:00 a.m. CEST)Tropical Depression Vince makes landfall near Huelva, Spain, with  winds.
 09:00 UTC (11:00 a.m. CEST)Tropical Depression Vince, the first recorded tropical cyclone to reach the Iberian Peninsula, begins to lose its tropical characteristics as it makes landfall and later dissipates over southern Spain.

October 15
 18:00 UTC (2:00 p.m.

October 17
 06:00 UTC (2:00 a.m. EDT)Tropical Depression Twenty-four strengthens into Tropical Storm Wilma southeast of Grand Cayman.

October 18
 12:00 UTC (8:00 a.m. EDT)Tropical Storm Wilma strengthens into Hurricane Wilma south-southeast of Grand Cayman.
 19:00 UTC (2:00 p.m. EDT)Hurricane Wilma reaches Category 2 intensity south of Grand Cayman.
 21:00 UTC (5:00 p.m. EDT)Hurricane Wilma reaches Category 3 intensity south of Grand Cayman.

October 19
 00:00 UTC (8:00 p.m. EDT, October 18)Hurricane Wilma reaches Category 4 intensity south of Grand Cayman.
 06:00 UTC (2:00 a.m. EDT)Hurricane Wilma reaches Category 5 intensity south-southwest of Grand Cayman.
 12:00 UTC (8:00 a.m.

October 20
 03:00 UTC (11:00 p.m.

October 21
 21:45 UTC (4:45 p.m. CDT)Hurricane Wilma makes landfall on the Island of Cozumel with  winds.

October 22
 03:30 UTC (10:30 p.m. CDT, October 21)Hurricane Wilma makes landfall at Puerto Morelos, Quintana Roo with  winds.
 12:00 UTC (8:00 a.m. EDT)Tropical Depression Twenty-five forms southwest of San Juan Puerto Rico.
 18:00 UTC (2:00 p.m. EDT)Tropical Depression Twenty-five strengthens into Tropical Storm Alpha south-southeast of Hispaniola.

October 23
00:00 UTC (7:00 p.m.
 06:00 UTC (2:00 a.m.
 10:00 UTC (6:00 a.m. EDT)Tropical Storm Alpha makes landfall near Barahona, Dominican Republic with  winds.
 18:00 UTC (2:00 p.m. EDT)Tropical Storm Alpha weakens into a tropical depression in the high mountains of Hispaniola and is subsequently absorbed by the much larger circulation of Hurricane Wilma.

October 24
 06:00 UTC (2:00 a.m. EDT)Hurricane Wilma re-intensifies to Category 3 west-northwest of Key West, Florida.
 10:30 UTC (6:30 a.m. EDT)Hurricane Wilma makes landfall near Cape Romano, Florida, with  winds.
 17:00 UTC (1:00 p.m.

October 25
 00:00 UTC (8:00 p.m.
 15:00 UTC (11:00 a.m.

October 26
 00:00 UTC (8:00 p.m.
 18:00 UTC (2:00 p.m.

October 27
 06:00 UTC (2:00 a.m.

October 29
 06:00 UTC (2:00 a.m. EDT)Tropical Storm Beta intensifies to hurricane strength just northwest of Providencia Island.

October 30
 00:00 UTC (8:00 p.m.
 06:00 UTC (1:00 a.m.
 12:00 UTC (7:00 a.m. EST)Hurricane Beta makes landfall on the central coast of Nicaragua near La Barra del Río Grande, with  winds.
 18:00 UTC (1:00 p.m.

October 31
 03:00 UTC (10:00 p.m.

November

November 14
 00:00 UTC (8:00 p.m.

November 15
 06:00 UTC (2:00 a.m. AST)Tropical Depression Twenty-seven strengthens undetected into a tropical storm.
 15:00 UTC (11:00 a.m.

November 16
 18:00 UTC (1:00 p.m.

November 18
 18:00 UTC (12:00 p.m. CST)Remnants of Tropical Depression Twenty-seven regenerate into Tropical Storm Gamma along the northern coast of Honduras near Limón.

November 19
 12:00 UTC (6:00 a.m.

November 20
 12:00 UTC (7:00 a.m.

November 21
 03:00 UTC (10:00 p.m.

November 22
 18:00 UTC (2:00 p.m.

November 23
 12:00 UTC (8:00 a.m. AST)Subtropical Storm Delta gains tropical characteristics and becomes Tropical Storm Delta over the central Atlantic.

November 24
 12:00 UTC (8:00 a.m.

November 28
 12:00 UTC (8:00 a.m.

November 29
 06:00 UTC (2:00 a.m. AST)Tropical Storm Epsilon forms east of Bermuda.

November 30
 The 2005 Atlantic hurricane season officially ends.

December

December 2
 18:00 UTC (2:00 p.m.

December 5
 06:00 UTC (2:00 a.m.

December 7
 18:00 UTC (2:00 p.m.

December 8
 12:00 UTC (8:00 a.m. AST)Tropical Storm Epsilon weakens into a tropical depression.
 18:00 UTC (2:00 p.m. AST)Tropical Depression Epsilon degenerates to a remnant low and later dissipates.

December 30
 00:00 UTC (8:00 p.m. AST, December 29)Tropical Depression Thirty forms over the eastern Atlantic.
 06:00 UTC (2:00 a.m. AST)Tropical Depression Thirty strengthens into Tropical Storm Zeta.

January 2006

January 1
 18:00 UTC (2:00 p.m.

January 6
 06:00 UTC (2:00 a.m. AST)Tropical Storm Zeta weakens into a tropical depression.
 18:00 UTC (2:00 p.m. AST)Tropical Depression Zeta degenerates into a remnant low which subsequently dissipates southeast of Bermuda, bringing the 2005 Atlantic hurricane season to a close.

Notes

See also

Timeline of Hurricane Katrina
Timeline of the 2005 Pacific hurricane season
Timeline of the 2005 Pacific typhoon season

References

External links

 2005 Tropical Cyclone Advisory Archive, National Hurricane Center and Central Pacific Hurricane Center
 Hurricanes and Tropical Storms – Annual 2005, National Centers for Environmental Information

 Timeline
2005 Atlantic hurricane season
Articles which contain graphical timelines
2005 Atl T